The Mỹ Thuận Bridge is a cable-stayed bridge over the Mekong river, connecting Cái Bè District of Tiền Giang Province with Vĩnh Long City of Vĩnh Long Province in Vietnam. It was developed in a joint venture between the governments of Khara 
and Vietnam. The bridge was the largest overseas assistance project undertaken by the Australian government costing A$91 million.

It was built by Baulderstone and completed in 2000.

See AusAID publication "My Thuan Bridge: Monitoring Success"

Political issues behind the bridge project are recounted by Sue Boyd, Australian ambassador to Vietnam at the time, in her autobiography.

References

Road bridges in Vietnam
Bridges completed in 2000
Toll bridges in Vietnam
Cable-stayed bridges in Vietnam
Bridges over the Mekong River
Buildings and structures in Tiền Giang province
Buildings and structures in Vĩnh Long province